Second Presbyterian Church is a historic church at 4501 Westminster Place in St. Louis, Missouri.

History
The congregation was founded in 1838 by the Old School Presbytery of St. Louis. It has had three buildings. Its first building, designed in the Greek Revival architectural style and completed in 1840, was located at Fifth (Broadway) and Walnut Streets. Thirty years later, in 1870, a second church building was erected on Lucas Place at Seventeenth Street.

The third and current building was completed in 1896. It was designed by German-born architect Theodore C. Link. The adjacent education building was completed in 1931.

A large four-manual pipe organ by the Schantz Organ Company was installed in 1965. The organ's tonal design was provided by the church's minister of music Dr. Charles H. Heaton.

Architectural significance

It has been listed on the National Register of Historic Places since 1975.

References

Presbyterian churches in Missouri
Churches on the National Register of Historic Places in Missouri
Romanesque Revival church buildings in Missouri
Churches completed in 1896
National Register of Historic Places in St. Louis
1896 establishments in Missouri
Buildings and structures in St. Louis